The men's artistic individual all-around competition at the 1948 Summer Olympics was held at Earls Court Exhibition Centre on 12 and 13 August. It was the tenth appearance of the event. There were 123 competitors from 16 nations, with each nation sending a team of up to 8 gymnasts. The event was won by Veikko Huhtanen of Finland, the nation's first victory in the men's all-around. Finland also earned bronze, with Paavo Aaltonen finishing third. For the second consecutive Games, Switzerland took silver—this time with Walter Lehmann as the nation's medalist.

Background

This was the 10th appearance of the men's individual all-around. The first individual all-around competition had been held in 1900, after the 1896 competitions featured only individual apparatus events. A men's individual all-around has been held every Games since 1900.

Two of the top 10 gymnasts from the pre-war 1936 Games returned: fifth-place finisher Michael Reusch of Switzerland and ninth-place finisher Heikki Savolainen of Finland. Savolainen had also finished in the top 10 in 1928 and won a bronze medal in the event in 1932. Reigning gold medalist Alfred Schwarzmann was unable to defend his title due to Germany not being invited to the Games following World War II, though he would return in 1952. The last World Championships had been held in 1938, with no international competitions since the war, so it was difficult to determine a favorite.

Argentina, Cuba, and Mexico each made their debut in the event. Italy made its ninth appearance, most among nations, having missed only the 1904 Games in St. Louis.

Competition format

The gymnastics format continued to use the aggregation format. Each nation entered a team of up to eight gymnasts (Cuba and Argentina had only 7; Mexico only 5). All entrants in the gymnastics competitions performed both a compulsory exercise and a voluntary exercise for each apparatus, with the scores summed to give a final total. The scores in each of the six apparatus competitions were added together to give individual all-around scores; the top six individual scores on each team were summed to give a team all-around score. No separate finals were contested.

For each exercise, four judges gave scores from 0 to 10 in one-tenth point increments. The top and bottom scores were discarded and the remaining two scores summed to give the exercise total. If the two scores were sufficiently far apart, the judges would "confer" and decide on a score. Thus, exercise scores ranged from 0 to 20, apparatus scores from 0 to 40, individual totals from 0 to 240, and team scores from 0 to 1,440.

Schedule

All times are British Summer Time (UTC+1)

Results

References

Men's artistic individual all-around
1948
Men's events at the 1948 Summer Olympics